Biochemical Pharmacology is a peer-reviewed medical journal published by Elsevier. It covers research on the pharmacodynamics and pharmacokinetics of drugs and non-therapeutic xenobiotics. The editor-in-chief is S. J. Enna, University of Kansas Medical Center, Kansas City.

Abstracting and indexing 
The journal is abstracted and indexed in:

According to the Journal Citation Reports, the journal received a 2019 impact factor of 5.858.

References

External links 
 

Pharmacology journals
Biochemistry journals
Elsevier academic journals
Publications established in 1958
Biweekly journals
English-language journals